John William Boehne Jr. (March 2, 1895 – July 5, 1973) was an American World War I veteran who served six terms as a U.S. Representative from Indiana from 1931 to 1942

Biography 
Born in Evansville, Indiana, Boehne was the grandson of German immigrants, and son of John William Boehne, who also served in Congress. He attended the public and parochial schools of Evansville and graduated from the University of Wisconsin–Madison in 1918.

World War I 
During World War I he served as a private and sergeant in the Detached Service of the Ordnance Corps of the United States Army from January 9, 1918, to April 8, 1919. He was secretary and treasurer of Evansville's Indiana Stove Works from 1920 to 1931.

Congress 
Boehne was elected as a Democrat to the Seventy-second Congress. He was reelected five times and served from March 4, 1931, to January 3, 1943). In 1942, he was an unsuccessful candidate for reelection to the Seventy-eighth Congress.

Later career and death 
From 1943 to 1957, Boehne was a corporation tax counselor in Washington, D.C. and resided in Chevy Chase, Maryland. After retiring, he was a resident of Irvington, Baltimore, Maryland.

He died in Irvington on July 5, 1973, and was buried at Rock Creek Cemetery in Washington, D.C.

References

1895 births
1973 deaths
American Lutherans
American people of German descent
United States Army personnel of World War I
Politicians from Evansville, Indiana
University of Wisconsin–Madison alumni
United States Army soldiers
Democratic Party members of the United States House of Representatives from Indiana
20th-century American politicians
20th-century Lutherans
Burials at Rock Creek Cemetery